Battambang Province is one of the 25 constituencies of the National Assembly of Cambodia. It is allocated 10 seats in the National Assembly.

MPs

References

Parliamentary constituencies in Cambodia
1993 establishments in Cambodia
Constituencies established in 1993